Nellemose is a surname. Notable people with the surname include: 

Karin Nellemose (1905–1993), Danish actress
Knud Nellemose (1908–1997), Danish sculptor 

Danish-language surnames